Kishacoquillas is an unincorporated community in Mifflin County, in the U.S. state of Pennsylvania.

History
A post office called Kishacoquillas was established in 1834, and remained in operation until it was discontinued in 1914. The community was named for a Native American chieftain.

References

Unincorporated communities in Mifflin County, Pennsylvania
Unincorporated communities in Pennsylvania